The fifth season of the American animated television series The Simpsons originally aired on the Fox network between September 30, 1993, and May 19, 1994. The showrunner for the fifth production season was David Mirkin who executive produced 20 episodes. Al Jean and Mike Reiss executive produced the remaining two, which were both hold overs that were produced for the previous season. The season contains some of the series' most acclaimed and popular  episodes, including "Cape Feare", "Homer Goes to College"  and "Rosebud". It also includes the 100th episode, "Sweet Seymour Skinner's Baadasssss Song". The season was nominated for two Primetime Emmy Awards and won an Annie Award for Best Animated Television Program as well as an Environmental Media Award and a Genesis Award. The DVD box set was released in Region 1 on December 21, 2004, Region 2 on March 21, 2005, and Region 4 on March 23, 2005.

Production
The season was the first to be executive produced by David Mirkin, who would also run the following season. Several of the show's original writers who had worked on The Simpsons since the first season had left following the completion of season four. "Cape Feare", which was the final episode to be produced by the "original team", aired during this season as a hold over. Jay Kogen, Wallace Wolodarsky, Sam Simon and Jeff Martin wrote their final episodes for the season four production run. Show runners Al Jean and Mike Reiss left to produce their own series The Critic, but returned in subsequent seasons to produce more Simpsons episodes, and Jean again became the show runner starting with season thirteen. George Meyer and John Swartzwelder, Conan O'Brien, Frank Mula and future show runners Bill Oakley and Josh Weinstein all stayed with the show following the previous season. O'Brien would leave the series halfway through the production of the season to host his own show on NBC, Late Night with Conan O'Brien. He had been working on "Homer Goes to College" when he found out he was chosen to host Late Night and was forced to walk out on his contract. He later had a cameo appearance in "Bart Gets Famous". He recorded his part while Late Night was on the air, but O'Brien thought that his show might be canceled by the time the episode aired.

A whole new group of writers were brought in for this season. Jace Richdale was the first to be hired by Mirkin and others to receive their first writing credits were Greg Daniels and Dan McGrath. Mike Scully wrote "Lisa's Rival", which was produced for this season, but aired the next. Two freelance writers wrote episodes: David Richardson wrote "Homer Loves Flanders" while Bill Canterbury received two writing credits. Bob Anderson and Susie Dietter, who had previously worked on the show as part of the animation staff, would direct their first episodes.

The season started off with "Homer's Barbershop Quartet" which was chosen as the season premiere because it guest starred George Harrison. The Fox executives had wanted to premiere with "Homer Goes to College" because it was a National Lampoon's Animal House parody, but the writers felt "Homer's Barbershop Quartet" would be a better episode because of Harrison's involvement. Even though the episode aired during the beginning of the fifth season, "Cape Feare" was the last episode written by the original team of writers and guest starred Kelsey Grammer as Sideshow Bob. Compared to previously produced episodes, the episode featured several elements that could be described as cartoonish. This was a result of the staff's careless attitude towards the end of season four as the majority of them were leaving which, combined with the shortness of the episode, led to the creation of the rake sequence, became a memorable moment for this episode. "Cape Feare" and "Rosebud" were both broadcast early in the season and are amongst the series' most acclaimed episodes, both having placed highly on Entertainment Weekly's list of the top 25 episodes. The episode "Deep Space Homer" was the only episode to be written by David Mirkin and was controversial amongst the show's writing staff when the episode was in production. Some of the writers felt that having Homer go into space was too "large" an idea. Matt Groening felt that the idea was so big that it gave the writers "nowhere to go". As a result, every aspect of the show was worked on to make the concept work. The writers focused more upon the relationship between Homer and his family and Homer's attempts to be a hero. "Sweet Seymour Skinner's Baadasssss Song" was the series' 100th episode. It was chosen because it heavily featured Bart and was promoted as "Bart's biggest prank ever," even though Bart did not actually pull any pranks in the episode; rather, Bart accidentally let his dog loose, eventually resulting in Principal Skinner's firing. Cletus Spuckler and the Rich Texan were the only recurring characters to be introduced this season, first appearing in "Bart Gets an Elephant", and "$pringfield" respectively. Other minor characters who first appeared this season were Luigi and Baby Gerald. Two more episodes, "Bart of Darkness" and "Lisa's Rival" were produced as part of the season five (1F) production run, but both aired the following season.

Voice cast & characters

Main cast
 Dan Castellaneta as Homer Simpson, Grampa Simpson, Krusty the Clown, Groundskeeper Willie, Barney Gumble and various others
 Julie Kavner as Marge Simpson, Patty Bouvier, Selma Bouvier and various others
 Nancy Cartwright as Bart Simpson, Nelson Muntz, Ralph Wiggum and various others
 Yeardley Smith as Lisa Simpson
 Harry Shearer as Mr. Burns, Waylon Smithers, Ned Flanders, Principal Skinner, Lenny Leonard, Kent Brockman, Reverend Lovejoy, and various others
 Hank Azaria as Moe Szyslak, Chief Wiggum, Professor Frink, Comic Book Guy, Apu, Bumblebee Man and various others

Recurring
 Pamela Hayden as Milhouse van Houten, Jimbo Jones
 Maggie Roswell as Maude Flanders, Helen Lovejoy and Miss Hoover
 Russi Taylor as Martin Prince and Sherri and Terri
 Tress MacNeille as Agnes Skinner
 Marcia Wallace as Edna Krabappel
 Joe Mantegna as Fat Tony 
 Frank Welker as Santa's Little Helper, various animals

Guest stars

 Phil Hartman as Troy McClure, Lionel Hutz (various episodes)
 George Harrison as himself ("Homer's Barbershop Quartet")
 David Crosby as himself ("Homer's Barbershop Quartet")
 The Dapper Dans as the singing voices of the Be Sharps ("Homer's Barbershop Quartet")
 Kelsey Grammer as Sideshow Bob ("Cape Feare")
 The Ramones as themselves ("Rosebud")
 Pamela Reed as Ruth Powers ("Marge on the Lam")
 George Fenneman as the narrator ("Marge on the Lam")
 Albert Brooks as Brad Goodman ("Bart's Inner Child")
 James Brown as himself ("Bart's Inner Child")
  Ernest Borgnine as himself ("Boy-Scoutz 'n the Hood")
 Michelle Pfeiffer as Mindy Simmons ("The Last Temptation of Homer")
 Werner Klemperer as Colonel Klink ("The Last Temptation of Homer")
 Gerry Cooney as himself ("$pringfield (or, How I Learned to Stop Worrying and Love Legalized Gambling)")
 Robert Goulet as himself ("$pringfield (or, How I Learned to Stop Worrying and Love Legalized Gambling)")
 Sam Neill as Molloy ("Homer the Vigilante")
 Conan O'Brien as himself ("Bart Gets Famous")
 James Woods as himself ("Homer and Apu")
 Kathleen Turner as Stacy Lovell ("Lisa vs. Malibu Stacy")
 Buzz Aldrin as himself ("Deep Space Homer")
 James Taylor as himself ("Deep Space Homer")

Reception
On Rotten Tomatoes, the fifth season of The Simpsons has a 100% approval rating based on 5 critical  reviews.

Awards
The Simpsons won an Annie Award for Best Animated Television Production, while David Silverman received a nomination for "Best Individual Achievement for Creative Supervision in the Field of Animation". "Bart Gets an Elephant" won both an Environmental Media Award for "Best Television Episodic Comedy" and a Genesis Award for "Best Television Comedy Series".

At the Primetime Emmy Awards, Alf Clausen and Greg Daniels received a nomination in the "Outstanding Individual Achievement in Music and Lyrics" category for the song "Who Needs The Kwik-E-Mart?" from the episode "Homer and Apu". Clausen also was nominated for "Outstanding Individual Achievement in Music Composition for a Series (Dramatic Underscore)" for the episode "Cape Feare". The producers submitted episodes for "Outstanding Comedy Series" category rather than the "Outstanding Animated Program" as they had previously done and were not nominated. The series was also nominated for a Saturn Award for "Best Genre Television Series".

At the 10th annual Television Critics Association Awards, the fifth season of the show was nominated for 'Outstanding Achievement in Comedy,' but lost to "Frasier."

Ratings
Like the previous three seasons, The Simpsons aired Thursday at 8:00 pm in the United States and was coupled with the series The Sinbad Show. "Homer's Barbershop Quartet", the season premiere, finished 30th in the ratings with a Nielsen rating of 12.7. "Treehouse of Horror IV", which was broadcast on October 28, was the highest rated episode of the season, finishing 17th with a Nielsen rating of 14.5 and finishing ninth in terms of viewers, being seen by approximately 24 million. "Secrets of a Successful Marriage", the season finale, aired during the week of May 16–22, 1994 and finished 43rd with a Nielsen rating of 9.8.

Episodes

DVD release

The DVD boxset for season five was released by 20th Century Fox in the United States and Canada on December 21, 2004, ten years after it had completed broadcast on television. As well as every episode from the season, the DVD release features bonus material including deleted scenes, animatics, and commentaries for every episode. The menus are a different format than the previous seasons, and that format would be used in every set after.
It is the last box set that features the Simpson family on television.

References

Bibliography

External links

Simpsons season 05
1993 American television seasons
1994 American television seasons